18th StLFCA Awards
December 19, 2021

Best Film:Licorice Pizza

The nominees for the 18th St. Louis Film Critics Association Awards were announced on December 12, 2021. The winners were announced on December 19, 2021.

Winners and nominees

Best Film
 Licorice Pizza
 Belfast
 The Power of the Dog
 The Tragedy of Macbeth
 West Side Story

Best Actor
 Nicolas Cage – Pig
 Benedict Cumberbatch – The Power of the Dog
 Andrew Garfield – tick, tick... BOOM!
 Will Smith – King Richard
 Denzel Washington – The Tragedy of Macbeth

Best Supporting Actor
 Kodi Smit-McPhee – The Power of the Dog
 Ben Affleck – The Last Duel
 Bradley Cooper – Licorice Pizza
 Ciarán Hinds – Belfast
 Jared Leto – House of Gucci

Best Original Screenplay
 Mass – Fran Kranz Being the Ricardos – Aaron Sorkin
 Belfast – Kenneth Branagh
 Licorice Pizza – Paul Thomas Anderson
 Pig – Michael Sarnoski (screenplay); Vanessa Block and Michael Sarnoski (story)

Best Animated Film
 The Mitchells vs. the Machines
 Encanto
 Flee
 Luca
 Vivo

Best International Film
 Drive My Car • Japan Flee • Denmark
 The Hand of God • Italy
 A Hero • Iran
 Titane • France

Best Cinematography
 The Power of the Dog – Ari Wegner Belfast – Haris Zambarloukos
 Dune – Greig Fraser
 The Tragedy of Macbeth – Bruno Delbonnel
 West Side Story – Janusz Kamiński

Best Costume Design
 Cruella – Jenny Beavan Dune – Robert Morgan and Jacqueline West
 House of Gucci – Janty Yates
 Last Night in Soho – Odile Dicks-Mireaux
 Spencer – Jacqueline Durran

Best Score
 Dune – Hans Zimmer Don't Look Up – Nicholas Britell
 The Power of the Dog – Jonny Greenwood
 Spencer – Jonny Greenwood
 The Tragedy of Macbeth – Carter Burwell

Best Visual Effects
 Dune – Brian Connor, Paul Lambert, Tristan Myles, and Gerd Nefzer Black Widow – Geoffrey Baumann, Paul Corbould, Craig Hammack, and Dave Hodgins
 Finch – Burt Dalton and Scott Stokdyk
 Free Guy – Swen Gillberg, Bryan Grill, Nikos Kalaitzidis, and Dan Sudick
 The Tragedy of Macbeth – Michael Huber and Alex Lemke

Best Comedy Film
 Licorice Pizza
 Don't Look Up
 Free Guy
 The French Dispatch
 The Mitchells vs. the Machines

Best Scene
 Licorice Pizza – Driving in reverse Belfast – Buddy freezes as the rioters approach
 Last Night in Soho – Eloise and Sandi share a dance with Jack
 tick, tick... BOOM! – Sunday brunch at the diner
 West Side Story – "America"

Best Director
 Jane Campion – The Power of the Dog
 Paul Thomas Anderson – Licorice Pizza
 Wes Anderson – The French Dispatch
 Kenneth Branagh – Belfast
 Steven Spielberg – West Side Story
 Denis Villeneuve – Dune

Best Actress
 Kristen Stewart – Spencer
 Jessica Chastain – The Eyes of Tammy Faye
 Olivia Colman – The Lost Daughter
 Lady Gaga – House of Gucci
 Nicole Kidman – Being the Ricardos

Best Supporting Actress
 Ann Dowd – Mass
 Kirsten Dunst – The Power of the Dog
 Aunjanue Ellis – King Richard
 Rita Moreno – West Side Story
 Ruth Negga – Passing

Best Adapted Screenplay
 The Power of the Dog – Jane Campion; based on the novel by Thomas Savage CODA – Sian Heder; based on the film La Famille Bélier (scenario by Victoria Bedos and Stanislas Carré de Malberg, screenplay by Éric Lartigau and Thomas Bidegain)
 Drive My Car – Ryusuke Hamaguchi and Takamasa Oe; based on the short story by Haruki Murakami
 Dune – Eric Roth, Jon Spaihts, and Denis Villeneuve; based on the novel by Frank Herbert
 West Side Story – Tony Kushner; based on the stage play book by Arthur Laurents

Best Documentary Film
 Flee
 The Rescue
 Summer of Soul
 Tina
 The Velvet Underground

Best Ensemble
 Mass
 Being the Ricardos
 Belfast
 The French Dispatch
 Licorice Pizza

Best Editing
 Last Night in Soho – Paul Machliss Belfast – Úna Ní Dhonghaíle
 Dune – Joe Walker
 Licorice Pizza – Andy Jurgensen
 West Side Story – Sarah Broshar and Michael Kahn

Best Production Design
 The French Dispatch – Adam Stockhausen Dune – Patrice Vermette
 Last Night in Soho – Marcus Rowland
 Nightmare Alley – Tamara Deverell
 West Side Story – Adam Stockhausen

Best Soundtrack
 Cruella
 Last Night in Soho
 Licorice Pizza
 The Tender Bar
 West Side Story

Best Action Film
 Shang-Chi and the Legend of the Ten Rings
 Black Widow
 Free Guy
 Nobody
 No Time to Die

Best Horror Film
 A Quiet Place Part II
 Candyman
 Lamb
 Last Night in Soho
 Titane

References

External links
 Official website

2021 in Missouri
2021 film awards
St. Louis
2021